The 2009 WDF World Cup was the 17th edition of the WDF World Cup darts tournament, organised by the World Darts Federation. It was held in Charlotte, North Carolina, USA from September 23 to 27.

Men's singles

Women's singles

Other Winners

Final Points Tables

Men

Women

Youth

References

External links
 Official site of 2009 World Cup
 WDF site for 2009 World Cup

WDF World Cup darts
2009
WDF World Cup